Here follows a list of notable alumni and faculty of Loyola Marymount University in Los Angeles, California, United States.

Alumni

Film and television 
 John Bailey - cinematographer, film director and former president of the Academy of Motion Picture Arts and Sciences, Ordinary People, Groundhog Day, He's Just Not That Into You
 Bob Beemer – Academy Award-winning sound mixer, Speed, Gladiator, Ray, Dreamgirls
 Maria Blasucci – actress, writer Mascots, Ghost Ghirls
 Laura Boersma – film producer and screenwriter, Fling, Indiscretion
 Travis Bowe (B.A. 2003) - writer, producer and voice-over actor, Family Guy, The Cleveland Show, Tosh.0
 Barbara Broccoli – producer, the James Bond film series
 Effie T. Brown - producer, Dear White People, But I'm a Cheerleader, Real Women Have Curves
 Tony Bui – film director, Three Seasons
Jennifer Candy - producer and actress, known for In Vino (2019), Liv and Maddie (2013) and Where's This Party? (2014). Daughter of John Candy.
 Linda Cardellini – actress,  Scooby-Doo, ER, Freaks and Geeks, Avengers: Endgame, Dead to Me
 Mindy Cohn – actress, The Facts of Life
 Carson Daly (dropped out) – television personality, Total Request Live, Last Call with Carson Daly
 Bob Denver – actor, Gilligan's Island, The Many Loves of Dobie Gillis
 Clark Duke – actor, Greek, Clark and Michael
 Scott Eastwood - actor, Gran Torino, Fury; son of Clint Eastwood
 Chase Ellison - actor, Tooth Fairy, The Boy Who Cried Werewolf
 David Mickey Evans – film and television director and writer, The Sandlot, Radio Flyer
 Lauren Froderman – dancer, winner of So You Think You Can Dance, season 7
 Mark Haapala (B.A. 2002) – television producer, director and actor, Entourage
 Jack Haley Jr. (B.A. English 1956) – Emmy-winning television and film writer, director, and producer; former president of Fox Television 
 Colin Hanks – actor, Orange County; son of Tom Hanks
 Emily Harper – actress, Passions
 Brian Helgeland (M.A. 1986) – Academy Award-winning screenwriter and film director, L.A. Confidential, Mystic River
 Dwayne Hickman – actor, The Many Loves of Dobie Gillis
 Kaliko Kauahi - actress, Superstore
 Gloria Calderón Kellett – writer and actress, co-showrunner of One Day at a Time
 Chris Kobin (LLS) – film and television writer and producer, Hollywood Don't Surf!
 Mila Kunis – actress, That '70s Show, Family Guy, Forgetting Sarah Marshall, Black Swan
 Christopher Landon - film director and writer, Happy Death Day, Freaky, Paranormal Activity: The Marked Ones
 Francis Lawrence (B.A. 1991) – film director, I Am Legend
 Emma Lockhart – actress, Batman Begins, Ace Ventura, Jr.: Pet Detective
 Holly Madison – television personality, The Girls Next Door
 Stephen McEveety – film producer, Braveheart, The Passion of the Christ
 Sean McNamara – film and television director and producer, Bratz, That's So Raven
 Dave Meyers – film and music video director, The Hitcher
 Kate Micucci (B.A. 2003) – actress, singer, and songwriter, Garfunkel and Oates
 David Mirkin (B.A. 1978) – Emmy-winning television producer, The Simpsons
 Beverley Mitchell – actress, 7th Heaven
 Glen Morgan – Emmy-nominated television and film writer, director, and producer, The X-Files, The Final Destination
 Lance Mungia – film director, Six-String Samurai
 John Stewart Muller – film director and screenwriter, Fling, Indiscretion
 Taylour Paige – dancer, actress, Hit The Floor
 Van Partible – television writer, producer, Johnny Bravo
 Busy Philipps – actress, Freaks and Geeks, Dawson's Creek, White Chicks, Cougar Town
 Tony Plana – actor, Ugly Betty
 Jessica Rey – actress, Power Rangers: Wild Force
 [Leon Robinson] - actor, singer, producer - "[Cool Runnings]" "[The Temptations]" "[Above The Rim]" "[OZ]" "[A Day To Die]" (2022)
 Steve Rossi – actor, part of the Allen & Rossi comedy duo
 Devin Sarno (B.A. 1988) – composer, video producer
 Stassi Schroeder – participant in The Amazing Race 8, Queen Bees, and star of Vanderpump Rules
 Chris Sullivan (B.A. 2002) – actor, The Knick
 Daniel J. Travanti (M.A. 1978) – actor, Hill Street Blues
 Anton Vassil – film director, Marching Out of Time, Laurent et Safi
 Michael Wayne – film producer and son of John Wayne
 Patrick Wayne – actor and son of John Wayne
 Michael R. Williams – feature film line producer and creator of Think Crew
 James Wong – Emmy-nominated television and film writer, director, and producer, The X-Files, The Final Destination
 Ava Sambora, actress and daughter of Richie Sambora and Heather Locklear

Literature 
 Luis Aguilar-Monsalve - writer and educator, Daryl R. Karns Award for Scholarly and Creative Activity
 Lisa See - writer, her books include On Gold Mountain, Shanghai Girls, Snow Flower and the Secret Fan

Music
 Jason Bentley, music director for KCRW
 Eric Erlandson, former lead guitarist for alternative rock band Hole
 Elvin Estela, hip hop producer and DJ
 Jauz, EDM Artist
 Matt Maust, bass player of Cold War Kids
 Jonnie Russell, former vocalist and multi-instrumentalist of Cold War Kids
 Michael Shuman, bass player for the Queens of the Stone Age
 Jimmy Tamborello, keyboard player and percussionist of The Postal Service, producer
 Mark Volman, singer and songwriter for The Turtles, The Mothers of Invention, and Flo & Eddie
 Omid Walizadeh, hip hop producer
 Nathan Willet, vocalist and multi-instrumentalist of Cold War Kids

Politics 
 Bill Bogaard, mayor of Pasadena, California
 Bill Campbell, politician and former California State Assembly Republican Leader
 Benjamin Cayetano, former governor of Hawaii (1994–2002)
 Tony Coelho, former Democratic member of the United States House of Representatives from California and Democratic Majority Whip
 Bob Dornan, former Republican member of the United States House of Representatives from California
 Rudy Sablan, former Lieutenant Governor of Guam (1975–1979)
 Helen Singleton, civil rights activist and Freedom Rider
Louis Vitale, priest and peace activist

Law 
 Johnnie Cochran, attorney; defended O. J. Simpson (J.D. graduate of Loyola Law School)
 Lynn Compton, former prosecutor, Superior Court Judge, and Appellate Court Judge; lead prosecutor in the case against Sirhan Sirhan who assassinated Robert F. Kennedy; also was awarded a Silver Star while serving as a Second Lieutenant commanding the 2nd platoon of Easy Company in the 506th Parachute Infantry Regiment, part of the 101st Airborne Division in World War II
 Mark Geragos, J.D. 1982, high-profile defense attorney (graduate of Loyola Law School)
 Tom Girardi, attorney, founding partner of Girardi & Keese, earned a reputation as L.A. County's king of the class action lawsuit
 Ronald S.W. Lew, attorney, judge
 Carmen Milano, Cleveland lawyer, eventually disbarred, later became a Mafia member
 Robert Shapiro, high-profile defense attorney; defended O. J. Simpson with Cochran (graduate of Loyola Law School)

Business 
 John Edward Anderson, President of Topa Equities, Ltd.; ranked #189 in the Forbes 400 Richest Americans list
 Jerry Grundhofer, former CEO of US Bancorp; previously ranked as the second highest paid executive in the banking industry
 Wilfred Von der Ahe, co-founder of Vons supermarket chain
 Henry C. Yuen, co-founder, and former CEO and Chairman, of Gemstar-TV Guide International (graduate of Loyola Law School)
 Tom Mueller (M.S. '92), co-founder, and VP of rocket propulsion at SpaceX
John Stankey, Current COO of AT&T, graduated with a B.A. in finance. On July 1, 2020, Stankey will start as CEO of AT&T.
Corey Epstein, Founder of DSTLD, Founder of Voyage SMS

Sports 

 Rick Adelman, former Head Coach of the Portland Trail Blazers, Sacramento Kings and Minnesota Timberwolves
 Billy Bean, former Major League Baseball outfielder
 Chris Donnels, retired Major League Baseball player (1991–2002)
Michael Erush (born 1984), soccer player and coach
 Corey Gaines (born 1965), basketball player and coach
 Hank Gathers, college basketball player who led NCAA division 1 in the 1988–1989 season in scoring and rebounding; died midgame in 1990
Ty Kelly (born 1988), Major league baseball player
 Gregory "Bo" Kimble, NBA player from 1991 to 1993
 Tim Layana, late Major League Baseball pitcher and World Series Champion (1990)
 Dick Moje, National Football League player
 Pete Newell, hall of fame basketball coach
 Maury Nipp, NFL player
 Chris Pettit, Major League Baseball outfielder
 Keith Smith, retired basketball player
 Jeff Stevens, Major League Baseball pitcher.
 Billy Traber, Major League Baseball pitcher
 Josh Whitesell, Major League Baseball first baseman for the Arizona Diamondbacks
 C.J. Wilson, Major League Baseball pitcher
 Phil Woolpert, hall of fame basketball coach

Religion 
 His Eminence Jean-Baptiste Phạm Minh Mẫn, Archbishop Emeritus of Saigon (Roman Catholic Church)
 Most Reverend Gordon Bennett, S.J., D.D., Bishop Emeritus of Mandeville (Roman Catholic Church)
 Most Reverend Cirilo Flores, Bishop of San Diego (Roman Catholic Church)
 Jean Dolores Schmidt, BVM (better known as Sister Jean) – current chaplain for the men's basketball team of Loyola University Chicago; became a major media celebrity during the team's 2018 Final Four run (M.A., 1961

Other 

Haley Sharpe - Tiktok star

Faculty 
 Most Reverend Gordon Bennett, S.J., D.D., Bishop Emeritus of Mandeville, Peter Faber, S.J. Fellow in Pastoral Theology and Ignatian Spirituality
 Antonia Darder, Ph.D., Professor of Education and Leavey Endowed Chair of Ethics and Moral Leadership
 Chris Donahue, Lecturer, School of Film and Television (Spring 1997–Fall 2002), Academy Award-winning film producer
 Rev. William Fulco, S.J., Ph.D., Professor of Classics and Archeology, National Endowment for the Humanities Professor of Ancient Mediterranean Studies
 Amir Hussain, Ph.D., Professor of Theological Studies and Editor of the Journal of the American Academy of Religion
 Helen Landgarten (1921-2011), American psychotherapist, art therapy pioneer. The Helen B. Landgarten Art Therapy Clinic at Loyola Marymount University was founded in 2007.
 Rubén Martínez,  Professor of English and Fletcher Jones Chair in Literature & Writing at Loyola Marymount University
 Rev. Thomas P. Rausch, S.J., Ph.D., Professor of Theological Studies, T. Marie Chilton Professor of Catholic Theology
 Chuck Rosenthal, Ph.D., Professor of English
 Paul Salamunovich, Ph.D (honoris causa) Professor of Music, conductor of the Los Angeles Master Chorale 1991–2001, Grammy Nominee, recipient of the Pro-Eclesia et Pontifice and a Knight Commander in the Order of St. Gregory, inaugural inductee: Loyola Marymount University Faculty Hall of Fame.
 Daniel L. Smith-Christopher, D.Phil., Professor of Theological Studies—Old Testament, Chair of the Peace Studies Program
 Wole Soyinka, Nobel Laureate, President's Marymount Professor
 Paul Tiyambe Zeleza, Ph.D., Dean of the Bellarmine College of Liberal Arts; President's Professor of African-American Studies and History
Hector Tobar, Adjunct Professor of Literature

References 

Loyola Marymount University people
Loyola Marymount University